Kenvil is an unincorporated community and census-designated place (CDP) located within Roxbury Township, in Morris County, New Jersey, United States, that had been part of the Succasunna-Kenvil CDP as part of the 2000 United States Census, at which time the population of the combined was 12,569. For the 2010 Census, the area was split into two CDPs, Succasunna (with a 2010 Census population of 9,152) and Kenvil (3,009 as of 2010).

History
The Kenvil section of Roxbury Township was originally called McCainsville.

Kenvil was home to the second dynamite plant in the US, established in 1872 by the Atlantic Giant Powder Company. After acquisition of the plant by the Hercules Powder Company in 1913, it also manufactured smokeless powder. The company experienced several major explosions, killing six people in 1934, 51 people in 1940, and shattering windows across town in 1989.

Geography
According to the United States Census Bureau, the CDP had a total area of 1.581 square miles (4.095 km2), including 1.330 square miles (3.444 km2) of land and 0.251 square miles (0.651 km2) of water (15.89%).

Demographics

Census 2010

Transportation
U.S. Route 46 and Route 10 pass through the area. The Dover and Rockaway River Railroad runs rail freight service through the area 2-5 times per week on the Chester Branch, High Bridge Branch and Dover & Rockaway Branch.

References

External links
 Kenvil NJ Hercules Explosion of 1940
 Kenvil NJ 07847

Census-designated places in Morris County, New Jersey
Roxbury Township, New Jersey